Philodromus collinus is a species of spider found in Europe and Russia.

See also 
 List of Philodromidae species

References

External links 

collinus
Spiders of Europe
Spiders of Russia
Spiders described in 1835